Communist Party of India (Marxist–Leninist) New Initiative was an Indian political party. It merged with CPI (ML) Janashakti COC to form CPI (ML) Unity Initiative. CPI (ML) New Initiative was led by Arvind Sinha.

References

Defunct communist parties in India
Political parties with year of establishment missing
Political parties with year of disestablishment missing